Saint Stephen's Church is located in the New Town of Edinburgh, Scotland, at the bottom of Saint Vincent Street. It was built in 1827–1828, to a design by architect William Henry Playfair (1789–1857).

The first minister of the church was William Muir, who opened an evening school in the large vaulted cellars of the church for the education of the illiterate.

The interior was altered in 1956, the congregation having declined. A major fundraising effort was organised led by the then minister, the Revd A. Ian Dunlop. This was one of the first subdivisions of major buildings in Edinburgh, with the reconstructed church occupying effectively the gallery level accessed by the main staircase from Howe Street, and a number of halls (including a main hall with fully fitted stage etc.) and meeting rooms formed below. These halls have over the years hosted a number of events including Festival Fringe shows. During the reconstruction the church fittings by architect David Rhind (1808–1883) were kept, as was the organ by Willis, which was re-built on the "gallery" level.

On 27 June 2014, Leslie Benzies, a video game producer and at the time president of Rockstar North, announced a deal to purchase the church for over 500 thousand pounds. He plans to preserve the building and create a trust composed of members of the community to manage it.

However, in 2017, Philip Johnston, trustee for the Benzies Foundation announced, "We now believe we have taken this as far as we can". On 12 July 2017, Peter Schaufuss, ballet dancer legend and founder of the English National Ballet School purchased the church from the Benzies Foundation, stating "I plan to make the Great Hall a world-class theatre, one that will attract productions from leading companies from around the world". Ground and basement areas, meanwhile, would be intended to find mixed commercial, cultural and community usage. St Stephen's has since his takeover gone through much refurbishment latest the main hall now named Ashton Hall with one of the largest performing spaces in Scotland. The building is the home of newly founded Edinburgh Festival Ballet and its School and Scottish theatre school MGA Academy, as well many other cultural activities. It plays an important role in the community as well as its role as a venue at the annual Festival.

Clock

The -high tower has the longest clock pendulum in Europe.

Performing space 
St Stephen's has hosted a number of shows at the Edinburgh Festival Fringe over the years. From 2001 to 2007 it hosted Wolfgang Hoffman's Aurora Nova venue, with a number of dance shows. Aurora Nova withdrew from the Fringe in 2008, citing costs and loss of sponsorship, and the space was not used in 2008. The space was revived in 2009, with The Arches at St Stephen's being planned for the 2009 festival.

In 2014, the building was for sale, with considerable speculation that it could be converted it into an arts centre with spaces for live music, dance and theatre.

References

External links
Photos of St Stephen's

Current floorplan, as published in 2014 schedule of sale 

Stephen
Churches completed in 1827
19th-century Lutheran churches
New Town, Edinburgh
Category A listed buildings in Edinburgh
Listed churches in Edinburgh
1827 establishments in Scotland
19th-century churches in the United Kingdom